The 1998 United States Senate election in Missouri was held on November 3, 1998. Incumbent Republican U.S. Senator Kit Bond won re-election to a third term.

Major candidates

Democratic
Jay Nixon, Attorney General of Missouri since 1993 and nominee in 1988

Republican
Kit Bond, incumbent U.S. Senator since 1987 and former Governor of Missouri from 1973 to 1977 and from 1981 to 1985

Results

See also
1998 United States Senate elections

References

Missouri
1998
1998 Missouri elections